Deflector may refer to:
 Fire screen
 Jet blast deflector
 Shields (Star Trek)
 Wind deflector

See also
 
 
 Deflection (disambiguation)
 Deflektor, a 1987 puzzle video game